Inka Wasi or Inkawasi (Quechua Inka Inca, wasi house, "Inca house", Hispanicized spellings Inca Huasi, Incahuasi, Incaguasi) may refer to:
Incahuasi, a volcano on the border between Argentina and Chile
Cerro Incahuasi, a mountain in Chile
Cerros de Incahuasi, a mountain in the Antofagasta Region, Chile
Incahuasi District or Inkawasi, a district in the Lambayeque Region, Peru
Inka Wasi (Apurímac), a mountain in the Apurímac Region, Peru
Inka Wasi, Ayacucho, an archaeological site in Ayacucho Region, Peru
Inka Wasi (Bolivia), a mountain in the Chuquisaca Department, Bolivia
Inka Wasi, Huancavelica, an archaeological site in Huancavelica Region, Peru
Inka Wasi, Lima, an archaeological site in Lima Region, Peru
Inka Wasi (Lucanas), a mountain in the Lucanas Province, Ayacucho Region, Peru
Inka Wasi River, a river in Bolivia
Inkawasi District, a district in the Cusco Region, Peru
Isla Incahuasi, a rock in Salar de Uyuni, Bolivia
Inca Huasi (ancient lake), an ancient lake in Bolivia

See also
 Inkawasi-Kañaris or Lambayeque Quechua, a variety of Quechua